Mark Anderson (born 13 February 1989) is an English footballer who plays as an attacking midfielder for Spennymoor Town.

College and amateur career

Barry University
Anderson played college soccer at Barry University in Miami Shores, Florida. As a freshman, he recorded 11 goals and 11 assists, leading the nation in assists per game.

Among other honors, Anderson was named 2011 Daktronics DII National Soccer Player of the Year and 2011 Capital One Academic All-America of the Year for DII men's soccer.

Baton Rouge Capitals
After his sophomore season at Barry, Anderson joined PDL side Baton Rouge Capitals. He helped the Capitals to a second-place finish in the Southeast Division and a run to the Semifinal round of playoffs.

Professional career

Fort Lauderdale Strikers
Anderson participated in the 2012 NASL Combine where he was picked up by the Fort Lauderdale Strikers. He was an integral part of the Strikers' unbeaten preseason, scoring three goals in the club's final three games. On 22 March 2012 the Strikers announced that Anderson had signed professional terms with the club. He chose the number 20 jersey, last worn by Gerson Mayen.

Anderson made his professional debut with the Strikers in the first match of the season as a second half sub against FC Edmonton on 7 April 2012. He scored his first professional goal in the Strikers 3–3 draw against the Carolina RailHawks at WakeMed Soccer Park with top-corner shot from outside of the box.

Since joining the Strikers, Anderson has scored several spectacular goals with both feet. He scored from inside his own half in the third round of the U.S. Open Cup in a match against the San Jose Earthquakes. On 2 June, he scored the winning goal from near the corner flag in a Florida Derby match against rivals Tampa Bay Rowdies.

On 30 July, Anderson recorded his first multiple goal game as a professional, scoring both goals in a 2–1 victory against the Carolina RailHawks. The goals were Anderson's sixth and seventh in the last seven NASL matches.

Carolina RailHawks
Anderson signed with NASL club Carolina RailHawks on 21 January 2015.

Spennymoor Town
Anderson signed with Spennymoor Town in his native country and county. In his first season, he helped them get promoted via the play-offs.

Marske United (loan)
On 19 November 2021, Anderson joined Northern Premier League Division One East side Marske United on a 28-day loan deal.

Career statistics

Club
Statistics accurate as of 25 March 2013

References

External links
 http://www.strikers.com/index.php?id=23&playerID=359 
 Goal from midfield - Youtube
 Goal from corner flag - Youtube

1989 births
Living people
English footballers
English expatriate footballers
Baton Rouge Capitals players
Fort Lauderdale Strikers players
North Carolina FC players
Expatriate soccer players in the United States
USL League Two players
North American Soccer League players
Spennymoor Town F.C. players
Marske United F.C. players
Northern Premier League players
Association football midfielders
English expatriate sportspeople in the United States